Greenville Presbyterian Church may refer to:

 Greenville Presbyterian Church (New York), 1790, in Greenville, New York, United States
 Greenville Presbyterian Church (South Carolina), 1852, near Donalds, Greenwood County, South Carolina, United States
 Greenville Presbyterian Church and Cemetery, 1829, in Greenville, Georgia, United States